|}

The Prix Ferdinand Dufaure is a Group 1 steeplechase in France which is open to four-year-old horses. It is run at Auteuil over a distance of 4,100 metres (about 2 miles and 4½ furlongs), and it is scheduled to take place each year in late May.

The event is named in memory of Ferdinand Dufaure, a former committee member of the Société des Steeple-Chases de France, who died in 1947. It was first run in 1951, and its distance was initially set at 4,500 metres. This was cut to 3,800 metres in 1953. The race was added to Auteuil's summer program in 1961, when another event, the Prix Maurice Gillois, was moved to the autumn. The length of the Prix Ferdinand Dufaure was frequently modified in the late 1960s and early 1970s, before a more settled period over 4,400 metres began in 1973. The present distance, 4,100 metres, was introduced in 1986.

The Prix Ferdinand Dufaure is the main trial for November's Prix Maurice Gillois (Grand Steeple-Chase des Quatre Ans), which is the championship race for four-year-old steeplechasers in France. Six horses have won both events, most recently Oculi in 2008. The runner-up in the 2007 Prix Ferdinand Dufaure, Master Minded, subsequently became a champion two-mile chaser in England.

Records
Leading jockey (6 wins):
 Christophe Pieux – Kizitca (1996), Valdance (1998), Bonbon Rose (2005), Or Noir de Somoza (2006), Remember Rose (2007), Rubi Ball (2009)

Leading trainer (6 wins):
 Jacques Ortet – Oblat (1983), Guchen (1985), Frappeuse (1988), Kizitca (1996), Valdance (1998), Rubi Ball (2009)

Leading owner (3 wins): (includes part ownership)
 Julien Décrion – Ki Ta Dai (1954), Morgex (1968), Biron (1970)
 Sean Mulryan – Cyrlight (2004), Bonbon Rose (2005), Or Noir de Somoza (2006)
 Magalen Bryant - Turgot (2001), Saint du Chenet (2010), Whetstone (2018)

Winners

References
 France Galop / Racing Post:
, 

 galop.courses-france.com:
 1951–1979, 1980–present

 france-galop.com – A Brief History: Prix Ferdinand Dufaure.
 pedigreequery.com – Prix Ferdinand Dufaure – Auteuil.

See also
 List of French jump horse races

Steeplechase (horse racing)
Horse races in France
Recurring sporting events established in 1951